The Roman Catholic  Diocese of Orizaba (erected 15 April 2000) is a suffragan diocese of the Archdiocese of Xalapa.

Ordinaries
Hipólito Reyes Larios (2000 - 2007), appointed Archbishop of Jalapa (Xalapa), Veracruz
Marcelino Hernández Rodríguez (2008 - 2013); named Bishop of the Roman Catholic Diocese of Colima, based in Colima, Mexico, by Pope Francis on Monday, November 11, 2013
Francisco Eduardo Cervantes Merino (2015 - )

Episcopal See
Orizaba, Veracruz

External links and references

Orizaba
Orizaba, Roman Catholic Diocese of
Orizaba
Orizaba